Jozo Bogdanović (born 21 October 1960) is a Croatian football coach and a former forward who played for several Croatian and foreign football clubs. He is the manager of the Under-19 squad of NK Lokomotiva.

Career
Jozo Bogdanović began his career playing for RNK Split which competed in the second and third level of Yugoslav league system. At the beginning of 1986 he moved to Dinamo Zagreb for whom he played 49 official matches and scored 16 goals in two and a half seasons and then he moved abroad. He finished his career playing for NK Inter Zapresic. Although he is deaf, he assimilated well in every team he played for.

Honours
RNK Split
Croatian Republic Football League - South: 1983-84

Inker Zaprešić
Croatian Cup: 1992

References

External links
 

Jozo Bogdanović at bundesliga.at

1960 births
Living people
Sportspeople from Dubrovnik
Croatian deaf people
Association football forwards
Deaf association football players
Yugoslav footballers
Croatian footballers
RNK Split players
GNK Dinamo Zagreb players
FC Kärnten players
HNK Rijeka players
NK Inter Zaprešić players
Yugoslav First League players
Austrian Football Bundesliga players
Croatian Football League players
Yugoslav expatriate footballers
Expatriate footballers in Austria
Yugoslav expatriate sportspeople in Austria
Croatian football managers